Government Engineering College Bhavnagar is a state-governed educational institution of Bhavnagar, Gujarat, India. Recognized by the All India Council of Technical Education (AICTE), it offers multi-discipline undergraduate programmes in engineering. The institute was affiliated to Bhavnagar University until April 2008, when it became affiliated to the Gujarat Technological University (GTU), Ahmedabad.

History 

The institute was established in the year 2004 with intake capacity of 120 students in the discipline of Electronics & Communication and Production Engineering, subsequently the intake was increased to 300 students in the year 2008 with Electronics & Communication (120) seats and Production Engineering (120) seats and introduction of Mechanical Engineering (60) seats. In 2009 and onwards total intake of the institute reaches to 540 students with introduction of Computer Engineering (60), Information & Technology (60) and Civil Engineering (60) as new discipline with increase in intake in Mechanical Engineering to 60 more seats

Infrastructure 
The current campus of the institute was inaugurated by the Chief Minister of Gujarat Narendra Modi on 18 February 2009.

It has separate blocks for Electronics and Communication Department, Mechanical and Production Department, Library Building, Amenity Building, Works Shop and Administrative Building. The library has more than 6000 books, with a book bank facility for the needy students.

Courses 
, the institute has 540 seats in engineering: 

 Civil Engineering 60
 Mechanical Engineering 120
 Production Engineering 120
 Electronics & Communication Engineering 120
 Information Technology 60
 Computer Engineering 60

Hostel facilities 
Recently this college provide separate hostels for boys and girls in which up to 99 and 444accommodations are available at present.

References 

http://www.gecbh.cteguj.in

External links 
http://www.gecbh.cteguj.in

Engineering colleges in Gujarat
Education in Bhavnagar